Lucie Wolf (née Johannesen; 25 May 1833 – 6 October 1902) was a Norwegian stage actress.

Biography

She was born in Bergen, Norway. She was the daughter of banker (1796–1882) and Johanne Andrea Jonsdotter (1799–1862).
She made her stage debut in 1850 at Ole Bull's Det norske Theater in Bergen. From 1853 she played at Christiania Theatre  and from 1901 at Nationaltheatret. She had her last stage performance in 1902.

She wrote about her experiences on the early Norwegian theater in Skuespillerinden Fru Lucie Wolfs Livserindringer (1897).
She was married in 1854 to the Danish actor and opera singer Jacob Wilhelm Nicolay Wolf (1824–1875).Their daughter Sigrid Wolf-Schøller (1863-1927) became a opera singer (mezzo-soprano) and music educator.

References

1833 births
1902 deaths
Actors from Bergen
19th-century Norwegian actresses